The New Force Social-Political Movement (MSPFN) is a minor political party in Moldova led by Valeriu Pleşca.

History
Registered on 28 May 1997, the party joined the For a Democratic and Prosperous Moldova alliance to contest the 1998 elections. The alliance received 18% of the vote, winning 24 of the 101 seats and becoming the third-largest faction in Parliament. The MSPFN held one seat, taken by Pleşca. It formed the Alliance for Democracy and Reforms coalition together with Democratic Convention of Moldova and the Party of Democratic Forces, which was able to form a government led by Ion Ciubuc.

The party contested the 1999 local elections as part of the Centrist Alliance, which won around 20% of the seats. Prior to the 2001 parliamentary elections the party joined the Braghiş Alliance. The Alliance won 19 seats, one of which was taken by the MSPFN's Pleşca.

Following the 2003 local elections, in which the MSPFN received only 162 votes, winning just two seats across the country, the party did not contest any further elections until the 2011 local elections (although Pleşca did run in the 2010 parliamentary elections as an independent), when it was part of the Third Force alliance that won 41 seats and one mayoralty.

References

Political parties in Moldova
Political parties established in 1997